Moon Over Miami may refer to:
 Moon Over Miami (film), 1941 musical
 Moon Over Miami (TV series), 1993 drama/crime series
 Moon Over Miami (song), 1935 song by Joe Burke and Edgar Leslie
 Moon Over Miami (script), a film script written to portray the Abscam Operation